Vectura Group Limited is a British pharmaceuticals company based in Chippenham, England which develops inhaled medicines and makes inhaler devices. The company was listed on the London Stock Exchange until it was acquired by Philip Morris International in September 2021.

History
The company was formed in 1997 at the University of Bath as a start-up pharmaceuticals business. In 1999 it acquired Co-ordinated Drug Development and the Centre for Drug Formulation Studies. The company moved from the university campus to a site at Chippenham in 2002. In 2004 it was listed on the Alternative Investment Market. In 2006 it acquired Innovata Biomed plc, another developer of pulmonary products, and then moved onto the full list of the London Stock Exchange. It acquired Activaero, a German manufacturer in the same sector, for £108million in March 2014. In June 2016 Vectura completed a £441million merger with Skyepharma, a maker of devices such as asthma inhalers; it was announced that the merged company would continue to be known as Vectura.

The former Skyepharma manufacturing plant at Lyon, France, makes various oral products including tablets. After Vectura decided to concentrate on inhaled products, in June 2021 the company supported a buy-out of the site by its management, with finance from Bpifrance.

In July 2021, American tobacco company Philip Morris International made an offer to buy Vectura Group for £1 billion. The Carlyle Group, an American private equity firm, also submitted an offer which was £44m lower. The board subsequently accepted the offer from Philip Morris International and, in September 2021, the company confirmed that circa 75% of shareholders had supported the takeover.

Operations
Vectura is a developer of inhaled therapies for the treatment of respiratory diseases. Since 2019 it has operated as a contract development and manufacturing organization (CDMO), helping other companies bring inhaled medicines to market.

The headquarters and development facility at Chippenham, on a mixed industrial site on the outskirts of the town, employs around 250 . There are also development sites at Cambridge, Muttenz (Basel, Switzerland) and Gauting (Germany). There are plans for a new research & development building at the Bristol and Bath Science Park, not far from Chippenham, which could open in 2025.

References

External links
 

2021 mergers and acquisitions
British companies established in 1997
British subsidiaries of foreign companies
Chippenham
Companies based in Wiltshire
Companies formerly listed on the London Stock Exchange
Pharmaceutical companies established in 1997
Pharmaceutical companies of England
Philip Morris International